Lauro António de Carvalho Torres Corado (18 August 1942 – 3 February 2022) was a Portuguese film director.

His 1980 film Morning Undersea was entered into the 12th Moscow International Film Festival where it won a Special Diploma.

Lauro António died on 3 February 2022, at the age of 79.

Filmography as director 
José Viana, 50 anos de carreira (1998) 
O Vestido Cor de Fogo (1986) 
A Bela e a Rosa (1984) 
Casino Oceano (1983) (TV) 
Mãe Genovena (1983) 
Paisagem Sem Barcos (1983) 
Manhã Submersa (1980) 
O Zé-Povinho na Revolução (1978) 
Bonecos de Estremoz (1978) 
Vamos ao Nimas (1975) 
Prefácio a Vergílio Ferreira (1975)

References

External links

1942 births
2022 deaths
Portuguese film directors
Portuguese film critics
Portuguese film producers
Portuguese male dramatists and playwrights
University of Lisbon alumni
Commanders of the Order of Prince Henry
People from Lisbon
20th-century Portuguese dramatists and playwrights
20th-century Portuguese male writers
Portuguese screenwriters